The Hidden Step is the ninth studio album by English band Ozric Tentacles. It was released in 2000 on Stretchy Records. It was their last to include bassist Zia Ahmad Geelani (except for the track Oakum on Spirals in Hyperspace) and drummer "Rad" (Conrad Prince). It was also the first Ozric Tentacles album that does not feature a cover by the artist Blim; the cover art, by guitarist Edward Wynne, features his cat Pixel.

Track listing

 "Holohedron" – (5:50)
 "The Hidden Step" – (7:47)
 "Ashlandi Bol" – (6:04)
 "Aramanu" – (6:00)
 "Pixel Dream" – (6:21)
 "Tight Spin" – (8:45)
 "Ta Khut" – (7:06)

Band personnel
 Ed Wynne – guitar, synthesizers, sampled sound
 Seaweed (Christopher Lenox-Smith) – keyboards, synthesizers
 John Egan – flute, vocals
 Zia Geelani – bass guitar
 Rad (Conrad Prince) – percussion

References

2000 albums
Ozric Tentacles albums